René Oberthür (1852, Rennes – 27 April 1944) was a French entomologist who specialised in Coleoptera.
With his brother Charles Oberthür he worked in "Imprimerie Oberthür" the very successful printing business founded by his  father François-Charles Oberthür.
René and Charles supplied free bibles, missals, catechisms and other printwork to missionaries in exchange for insect specimens. In addition they purchased on a large scale, acquiring almost all the large collections sold during their lifetime.

Works

Coleopterorum Novitates- Recueil spécialement consacré à l'étude des Coléoptères, Tome (Volume) 1 (1883)(the only published part of an intended series). Very few copies of this 80 page work, published by René himself, were printed and it ends abruptly.René Oberthür contributed "Scaphidides nouveaux"; "Nouvelles espèces de Monommides"; "Trois Nebria nouvelles"; "Un Coptolabrus nouveau"; "Carabiques récoltés à Saint-Laurent-du Maroni par Nodier"; "Deux espèces nouvelles de Geotrupides"; "Trois espèces nouvelles du genre Helota"; "Deux espèces nouvelles du genre Lemodes" There were only two other contributors Maximilien Chaudoir "Carabiques nouveaux" and Léon Fairmaire Note sur le genre Chalaenus and Espèces nouvelles d'Hétéromères de Madagascar.
with C. Houlbert (1913) Lucanides de Java. Insecta; revue illustree d’Entomologie, Rennes 4 parts (1913–1914)-includes (1914) Catalogue systematique des lucanides considered somme ayant ete trouves dans l'ile de Java.

Collection

His collections are conserved by Muséum national d'histoire naturelle (5 million specimens in 20,000 cases) Museum Koenig and Museo Civico di Storia Naturale di Genova (Indomalayan and Papua Coleoptera).

References
 
 Anonym 1944 [Oberthur, R.] Bull. Soc. Ent. Fr. 49 61
Constantin, R. 1992 Memorial des Coléopteristes Français.Bull. liaison Assoc. Col. reg. parisienne, Paris (Suppl. 14) : 1-92 67
Vincent, R. 1986: [Oberthur, R.] Bull. liaison Assoc. Col. reg. parisienne 8: 8

External links
Culture France

1852 births
1944 deaths
Scientists from Rennes
French entomologists